Turquerie (anglicized as "Turkery"), or Turquoiserie, was the Turkish fashion in Western Europe from the 16th to 18th centuries for imitating aspects of Ottoman art and culture.  Many different Western European countries were fascinated by the exotic and relatively unknown culture of the Ottoman ruling class, which was the center of the Ottoman Empire.  This fashionable phenomenon became more popular through trading routes and increased diplomatic relationships between the Ottomans and the European nations, exemplified by the Franco-Ottoman alliance in 1715. Ambassadors and traders often returned home with tales of exotic places and souvenirs of their adventures.

The movement was often reflected in the art of the period. Music, paintings, architecture, and artifacts were frequently inspired by the Ottoman styles and methods. Paintings in particular portrayed the Ottomans with bright colours and sharp contrasts, suggesting their interesting peculiarity and exotic nature.

History of the movement

In the wake of the Age of Exploration, roughly between the 15th and 18th centuries, there was an explosion in the number of commodities and availability of products. People were using newly created cartography and using these maps to explore the world on paper. There was an accumulation of more objects and a desire for more acquisitions. Coupling this, there was the value of exoticism, valuing things that came from a great distance. Europeans and Ottomans alike were developing a consciousness of themselves in relation to the broader world. At the same time the Ottomans were slowly ceasing to be regarded as a serious military threat to Western Europe, despite their continuing occupation of the Balkans, and campaigns such as that ended by the Battle of Vienna as late as 1683.

New patterns of consumption were arising, especially with trading ships being able to navigate around Africa. Commodities that were once expensive were becoming more affordable. Products often define people in terms of gender, age, and availability of access. This notion of social definition outlines the main theme of the explosion of commodities from 16th century and onwards. The exchange system had to do precisely with accessibility and availability of commodities on a grand scale. It is important to note that this was not just a European phenomenon. The Europeans were not the only people who developed a sensibility of how consuming different things could define their relationships domestically and abroad. In this context, there was a broader view of consumption and one's place within the world. A person would consume in order to show off their financial position and their social location.

Coffee 

When coffee was first imported to Europe, locals looked to its place of origin to better understand the new phenomenon. Ottoman scholars—who had been studying the plant for centuries and were producing relevant, new sources—became the main reference for Edward Pococke and Antoine Galland’s written works on coffee. Academia, such as this, was a key component within coffeehouse culture. The history of coffee in Europe as a product was inextricably linked to this culture. It was “an institution and a set of customs…transferred from one region to another,” in this case from the Ottoman Empire to western Europe. The introduction of coffee to the European scene was neither new nor just a common consumable good; it was a direct result of “Ottoman mediation.” 

Visiting elites from high-class European circles were frequently exposed to the drink through Ottoman elites and diplomacy, complete with porcelain, embroidered napkins, and special etiquette. Furthermore, visiting Ottoman military or diplomatic officials would serve coffee in similar ways within European cities. Adhering to strict instructions, sequences, and measures, good coffee had to be prepared with a precision that the Ottomans had perfected, a skillset that Europeans had yet to learn to apply to their version of the bitter, crude drink.

European perspective 

Europeans developed an appetite for exoticism as greater emphasis was put on empire building and colonization in other nations. There was a growing fashion for Turkish styles in Europe in the 15th and 16th centuries. Europeans did not regard Ottomans as rivals that they had to contend with and imitate militarily, politically, or diplomatically, but rather as an exotic foreign people possessing quaint and strange fashions that could be consumed. Consuming these exotic fashions would show one's elite place in society as well as display their open-mindedness and interest in the world. These "obsessions" with Turkish aesthetics were in part brought on by the presence of Europeans in the Ottoman Court and the acts of bringing back their products to Europe. The increased mercantile relationships between the Turkish people and the Europeans aided this process; the continuation of these trading systems helped to spread new fashions quickly in Europe.

Decorations and patterns 

Brightly colored Turkish styles of decoration were used on many types of objects, including timepieces. Many of those imported had the hours and religious names in Arabic characters. A person who owned one of these timepieces was one with an increased social status.

The Turkish grandeur portrayed by the sultans was attractive to Europeans. Agostino Veneziano made a portrait of Suleyman the Magnificent, sultan of the Ottoman Empire in 1520. He was known as the “grand Turk” and constantly disrupted European balance. The image portrays the sultan as a gentle, yet barbaric person. He was most known for executing the wishes of the sultana, Roxelana, who wanted their children murdered to secure the throne for one of their sons.

Fabrics were often bright, rich, and embroidered, as depicted in the painting, Himan de la Grande Mosquee by Joseph-Marie Vien in 1748. In the context of turquerie, Turkish textiles were also a luxury in the elitist European homes. They often 
had velvet grounds with stylized floral motifs. They were often woven in Asia Minor for the European market or, more commonly, as Venetian, under Turkish influence. Italian-styled textiles were often woven by the Ottoman Turks for the Venetians because of their cheap labour and continued business relationships.

Portraits: European and American 

Social position was something very important in the 18th century so things like dress, posture, and props were carefully selected in order to communicate one's status. This need to express status mixed with a new interest for Turkish style allowed for Turkish dress and decorations to become very important props. This included wearing loose, flowing gowns belted with ornate bands of embroidered cloth and ermine-trimmed robes with tasseled turbans. Women even abandoned their corsets and attached strings of pearls to their hair for much more freeing material.

The loose clothing and the unorthodox styles added to the lewd perceptions of the Ottomans. This interest was something that motivated  the creation of many portraits were Turkish people were often depicted as exotic, and it became rare to see portraits where they were painted without wearing their traditional cultural clothing. Writing also contributed to the visual aspect of Turkish cultural exchange and perhaps the most influential transformation into the turquerie vogue in Europe was done by Lady Mary Wortley Montagu. Montagu went to Turkey in 1717 when her husband was posted as ambassador there. Her collected letters describing Turkish fashion were widely distributed in manuscript form in her social circle and were then printed for the public upon her death in 1762. Her letters and descriptions helped shape how Europeans interpreted the Turkish fashion and how to dress. This phenomenon eventually found its way across the Atlantic and in colonial America, where Montagu's letters were also published.

Music 

The music in operas that utilized the notion of turquerie was not seriously influenced by Turkish music. Composers in the 18th century were not interested in ethnomusicology, to adopt the style of sound of a particular country or area. The European audiences were not yet ready to accept the unappealing and what they thought of as primitive musical style of the Turkish people. Traditional Turkish music included wavering pitches, microtones, arabesques, different scale systems, and non-Western rhythmic patterns. Europeans thought of this type of music, as Wolfgang Amadeus Mozart once said, "offensive to the ears." Having short spurts of it in the operas were common, but just to add comedic affect.

In music, Orientalism may be applied to styles occurring in different periods, such as the alla turca, used by multiple composers including Mozart and Beethoven.

Opera 

European opera was influenced heavily by the idea of turquerie. Mehmed the Conqueror (1432–1481), one of the most prominent sultans of the Ottoman Empire, had many operas written about him. His conquest of Constantinople in 1453 was the basis of the German opera Mahumeth II, composed by Reinhard Keiser in 1693. In 1820, Gioachino Rossini composed Maometto II, which is set during the Siege of Negroponte (1470) by the forces of the Ottoman Empire, led by Sultan Mehmed II.

Moreover, there were many operas based on the ongoing conflicts between Timur and Beyazid I, including Tamerlano by George Handel. These stories of perseverance and passion appealed to many Europeans and therefore gained popularity. One of France’s most important opera genres was tragédie en musique, depicted by Scanderberg, with music by François Rebel and Francois Francoeur, set to a libretto by Antoine Houdar de la Motte in 1735. This opera was visually one of the most elaborate of the Turkish operas, with detailed scenic designs for mosques and seraglio courts. Many exotic characters were displayed as well.

Operas using themes from turquerie were in the usual European languages but tried to imitate the Turkish culture and customs. It offered a world of fantasy, splendor, and adventure that was unattainable by the average person. Audiences would be fascinated with the Turkish and Ottoman institutions depicted. The stories and implications as well as the extravagant costumes and elaborate staging appealed to the people. The Europeans craved reality in their depiction of the Turkish peoples. During performances, females would often be in the latest fashion, where local colour was suggested by foreign attire or numerous ornaments. The males tended to wear more authentic Turkish dress than the female, including a turban, sash, long caftan, and binding with rich material, since authentic Turkish female dress was often restrictive and plain.

See also 

Bloomers
Harem pants
Hammam
Oriental carpets in Renaissance painting
Ottoman clothing
Sarmatism
Slim-fit pants
Pajamas
Chapan
Turkish crescent
Chinoiserie
Seraglio
Turkey
Turkophilia
Turkeywork

Notes

References

Further reading 

Meyer, Eve R. "Turquerie and Eighteenth-Century Music." Eighteenth-Century Studies, Vol. 7, No. 4. (Summer, 1974), pp. 474–488.
 Katie Campbell, 'Turquerie, an Orientalist fantasy' in Cassone: The International Online Magazine of Art and Art Books, October 2014 http://www.cassone-art.com/magazine/article/2014/10/turquerie-an-orientalist-fantasy/?psrc=architecture-and-design

External links 

Picture of turquerie artwork by Jean Lurçat
Working definition of turquerie

European culture
Ottoman culture
Orientalism by type